Lesbian, gay, bisexual, and transgender (LGBT) persons in  Kiribati face legal challenges not experienced by non-LGBT residents. Male homosexuality is illegal in Kiribati with a penalty of up to 14 years in prison, but the law is not enforced. Female homosexuality is legal, but lesbians may face violence and discrimination. Despite this, employment discrimination on the basis of sexual orientation has been prohibited since 2015.

In November 2016, Kiribati voted against a plan to get rid of the UN Independent Expert on violence and discrimination based on sexual orientation and gender identity at the United Nations General Assembly. The push to get rid of the UN expert failed in an 84–77 vote. As the voting was on an amendment to block an anti-LGBT proposal, a vote in favor was a vote for keeping the special rapporteur on protection against violence and discrimination based on sexual orientation and gender identity. Kiribati along with Sri Lanka were the only two countries, where homosexuality is still criminalised, who voted this way.

History
Kiribati is home to a traditional transgender population, called binabinaaine. The Gilbertese word  refers to people who were assigned male at birth but act, dress and behave as female, while the word  has the opposite meaning, that being a person who was assigned female at birth but behaves as male. People who live as these gender roles have traditionally been accepted by Kiribati society, and are not perceived as immoral or disordered, but as belonging to a third gender alongside male and female.

Laws regarding same-sex sexual activity
Sections 153, 154, and 155 of the Penal Code outlaw anal intercourse and oral copulation, regardless of sex. There are no reports of prosecutions directed against LGBT people under these laws.

153. Unnatural Offences
Any person who-
(a) commits buggery with another person or with an animal; or
(b) permits a male person to commit buggery with him or her,
shall be guilty of a felony, and shall be liable to imprisonment for 14 years.

154. Attempts to commit unnatural offences and indecent assaults
Any person who attempts to commit any of the offences it specified in the last preceding section, or who is guilty of any assault with intent to commit the same, or any indecent assault upon any male person shall be guilty of a felony, and shall be liable to imprisonment for 7 years.

155. Indecent practices between males
Any male person who, whether in public or private, commits any act of gross indecency with another male person, or procures another male person to commit any act of gross indecency with him, or attempts to procure the commission of any such act by any male person with himself or with another male person, whether in public or private, shall be guilty of a felony, and shall be liable to imprisonment for 5 years.

Decriminalisation efforts
In August 2015, as part of the Universal Periodic Review, Kiribati's human rights record was scrutinised by other countries. France, Slovenia and Chile urged Kiribati to repeal its laws against homosexuality. The Kiribati delegation made no response to these recommendations.

Recognition of same-sex relationships
The Marriage Act (Cap 54) does not expressly forbid the recognition of same-sex marriages, but generally assumes the partners to be of the opposite sex. The law's "restrictions on marriage" section forbids marriages with family relatives, marriage where either party is below the age of 16 and bigamy. The Magistrate's Court has the legal power to void and dissolve marriages.

Discrimination protections
Discrimination against employees and prospective employees based on "sexual orientation" is prohibited under Article 107(2)(b) of the Employment and Industrial Relations Code 2015.

The Constitution of Kiribati does not expressly address discrimination based on sexual orientation or gender identity. Article 15(3), entitled "Protection from discrimination on the grounds of race, etc", states:
 in English: In this section, the expression "discriminatory" means affording different treatment to different persons attributable wholly or mainly to their respective descriptions by race, place of origin, political opinions, colour or creed whereby persons of one such description are subjected to disabilities or restrictions to which persons of another such description are not made subject or are accorded privileges or advantages which are not accorded to persons of another such description
 in Gilbertese:

Summary table

See also 
 Human rights in Kiribati
 LGBT rights in Oceania

References

LGBT in Kiribati
Kiribati
Politics of Kiribati
Human rights in Kiribati